Alexander Donald Kenneth Voltz (born 1999) is an Australian composer. He is also known for his political stance as a monarchist.

Education 

Voltz was born in Toowoomba, Queensland and grew up in Brisbane. He attended Brisbane Boys' College and later studied composition, history and writing at the University of Queensland. He studied composition with Robert Davidson, Cathy Likhuta and Nicole Murphy, and received the mentorship of Brenton Broadstock and Brett Dean.

Voltz has attributed his earliest opportunities and successes to the support of his family, in particular his father, the musician Bradley Voltz. John Curro and the Queensland Youth Orchestras have also been noted as championing Voltz's early music.

Career 

Voltz's music has been performed and supported by the Melbourne Symphony Orchestra, Opera Queensland, Australian Youth Orchestra, Ensemble Offspring, Flinders Quartet and others. He is twice a semi-finalist of the composition division of the Bartók World Competition.

In 2021, Voltz independently produced his first opera, Edward and Richard: The True Story of the Princes in the Tower. He was also commissioned as part of the Australian National Academy of Music's The ANAM Set, which he described as "a census of contemporary Australian art music".

In 2022, Voltz directed The Queen's Platinum Jubilee Concert, Australia's largest musical tribute during the Platinum Jubilee of Elizabeth II. He also served as Emerging Composer-in-Residence with Camerata – Queensland's Chamber Orchestra, and was a recipient of the Australian Broadcasting Corporation's Composer Commissioning Fund.

Politics 

Voltz is a Spokesperson for the Australian Monarchist League. In this capacity, he began writing for The Spectator Australia in 2022. He is critical of Anthony Albanese and the Australian Government for appointing Matt Thistlethwaite as Australia's first-ever Assistant Minister for the Republic. He was also critical of Lidia Thorpe when she failed to accurately swear her senatorial Oath of Allegiance and called Elizabeth II a "colonising queen". Following the death of The Queen, he appeared across national Australian media outlets, presenting the League's perspectives. Voltz has also written for Quadrant Magazine.

Voltz is a member of the Liberal National Party of Queensland. He has argued that the "concept of a republican Liberal is...oxymoronic" and that the party should reassert the values of Robert Menzies and "the primacy of the Crown".

References

External links
 

Living people
1999 births
Australian composers
Australian monarchists